Basrah District is a district of Basra Governorate, Iraq.

Districts of Basra Province